Montbazin is a commune in the Hérault department in the Occitanie region in southern France. It is part of the Agglomeration of Sete. In Roman times it was an important stopover on the road from Narbonne to Rome.

Population
Its inhabitants are referred to as Montbazinois.

Administration

Gallery

Personalities linked to the municipality 

 Pierre-Paul Poulalion, known as the “poète boiteux”, born in Montbazin on 29 June 1801, poet and writer.2
 Eugène Montel, born in Montbazin on 5 June 1885, teacher, journalist and politician.
 Jocelyne Carmichael, born in Paris on 13 February 1935 and died in Montbazin on 9 November 2017, poet, writer, director, French actress and activist for women's rights.3
 Pierre Mariétan, born in Monthey, Switzerland on 23 September 1935, lives in Montbazin. Composer and teacher.

See also
Communes of the Hérault department

References
2. Site memoiredemontbazin.fr, page on Pierre Paul Poulalion [archive], retrieved 1 August 2021.

3. «Jocelyne Carmichael» [archive], in Les Archives du Spectacle (retrieved 6 July 2019)

Bibliography 

 Jacky David, mémoire et images d'un village du midi de la France : [volume I], Frontignan, Impr. Soulié, 1996, 139 p.
 Jacky David, mémoire et images d'un village du midi de la France : [volume II], Frontignan, Impr. Soulié, 2012, 374 p.

External links

 Mayor's Website
 Montbazin Webzine
 Photos of the garrigues de thau tour of Montbazin

Communes of Hérault